The Samsung Galaxy Tab S3 is an Android-based tablet computer produced and marketed by Samsung Electronics. Belonging to the high-end "S" line, it was unveiled alongside the Galaxy Book at the MWC 2017, and was first released on March 24, 2017. It is available in Wi-Fi only and  Wi-Fi/4G LTE variants.

Its successor, the Samsung Galaxy Tab S4, was announced on August 1, 2018.

Features 
The Galaxy Tab S3 is the first device from Samsung to run Android 7.0 Nougat as default. For the first time since the Galaxy Tab 2, all the languages that were previously absent from other regions are available.

The tablet is slated to receive the Android Pie update in Mid 2019.

The device features a 9.7" 2,048 x 1,536 Super AMOLED display which supports HDR video. The Tab S3 has a Qualcomm Snapdragon 820 processor, 4GB of RAM, 32GB of on board storage and a 6000mAh battery. It is also supplied with a Samsung Galaxy Note series S Pen, the first of the Tab S range to do so.

Reception 
The Verge criticized the cameras on the device, being "softened and smudged", the limitations on multitasking, and the cramped Pogo keyboard, whilst praising the integration of the S Pen and it being lightweight.

Matt Swider of Tech Radar stated that the tablet was "Samsung’s best tablet design yet", praising the addition of the free S-Pen stylus and HDR-ready future-proofed screen while criticizing the costly keyboard and how a tablet "could not replace a laptop".

Xiaomare Blanco of CNET also called the device Samsung's best tablet and stated, "The Samsung Galaxy Tab S3 is an elegantly designed tablet that comes with a capable stylus. It has a stunning AMOLED screen, fingerprint sensor for extra security and satisfyingly loud quad speakers. It's also the first HDR-ready tablet." The reviewer was also disappointed that large applications take time to load, while the keyboard add-on is an expensive extra.

Max Parker of TrustedReviews noted the good addition of the HDR AMOLED display, S Pen and lightweight, but said that the software "lacks polish", "janky" multitasking on the device and that the glass back of the tablet was a "fingerprint magnet".

References

External links
 Samsung Galaxy Tab

 
Android (operating system) devices
Galaxy Tab
Tab
Tablet computers
Products introduced in 2017
Mobile phones introduced in 2017